Peanut Butter and Swelly is a mixtape by the Philadelphia hip hop music duo Chiddy Bang. It was released in May 2011 as a prequel to their  debut album Breakfast. The third mixtape released by the group, it consists of 15 tracks featuring several other rappers including Trae. The mixtape contains many references to the Guinness World Record for longest freestyle rap set by the group's rapper Chidera Anamege.

Track listing
 Cameras
 The Whistle Song
 Heatwave (feat. Mac Miller, Casey Veggies & Trae The Truth)
 Too Much Soul
 Baby Roulette (feat. Train)
 Guinness Flow
 I Can't Stop (Freestyle)
 Jacuzzi (Lost in the Vapors)
 High as a Ceiling (feat. eLDee The Don)
 Always (On My Grizzly) (feat. eLDee The Don)
 Y.T.M.O.S.H.? Y.A.S.N. (You Think My Old Shit Hard? You Ain't Seen Nothin')
 Dancing With The DJ [Remix]
 Nobody Has It Down
 All Over (feat. Gordon Voidwell)
 When You've Got Music (feat. The Knocks)

References 

2011 mixtape albums
Chiddy Bang albums